Tanvald is a town in Jablonec nad Nisou District in the Liberec Region of the Czech Republic. It has about 6,000 inhabitants.

Administrative parts
The town part of Šumburk nad Desnou and the village of Žďár are administrative parts of Tanvald.

Etymology
The original German name means literally "fir forest". The Czech name was created by transcription of the German name.

Geography
It lies in the Jizera Mountains. The town is situated at the confluence of the rivers Kamenice, which flows along the southern municipal border, and Desná, which flows across the eastern part of the municipal territory.

History
The first written mention of Tanvald is from 1586, when it was described as a lumbering settlement. In 1895, the village was promoted to a market town and in 1905 to a town. In 1848, Žďár was joined to Tanvald.

The first written mention of Šumburk nad Desnou is from the 17th century, it was probably founded between 1565 and 1581. In 1906, it was promoted to a market town and in 1925 to a town. In 1942, Tanvald and Šumburk nad Desnou were merged into one municipality.

From 1938 to 1945 Tanvald was annexed by Nazi Germany and administered as part of Reichsgau Sudetenland. The majority Sudeten German population was expelled in 1945. The town was then resettled with Czechs.

Demographics

Transport
The town has direct rail connection with Prague. Traffic on the railway line to Jelenia Góra in Poland was restricted in 1945 (the trains terminated in Harrachov) and reinstated in 2010. Koleje Dolnośląskie D21 line runs from Liberec to Szklarska Poręba via the town.

Sport
On Špičák mountain there is a ski resort.

Sights
The landmark of the town is the Church of Saint Francis of Assisi. It was built in the neo-Gothic style in 1899–1901.

Špičák mountain is known for the Tanvaldský Špičák observation tower.

Notable people
Libor Němeček (born 1968), tennis player and coach

Twin towns – sister cities

Tanvald is twinned with:
 Burbach, Germany
 Lubomierz, Poland
 Marcinowice, Poland
 Wittichenau, Germany

References

External links

Cities and towns in the Czech Republic
Populated places in Jablonec nad Nisou District